Guns N' Roses is a 1994 pinball machine made by Data East featuring the hard rock group Guns N' Roses. In 2020, Jersey Jack Pinball produced a new pinball machine: Guns N' Roses: Not in This Lifetime.

Original Data East gameplay

The artwork features photos by Robert John from his book Guns N' Roses: The Photographic History. This game is a widebody pinball game with several unique twists. Among them, is an old fashioned revolver, which players use to start the game as opposed to the typical plunger. When a quarter is inserted, the band's famous "Welcome to the Jungle" song (recorded from a concert) plays. Also included on the soundtrack is the Use Your Illusion outtake "Ain't Going Down", which is the only official release of the song. The backdrop is illuminated with lights in the shape of the famous Guns N' Roses seal, and Axl Rose's tattoos, featured in the Appetite for Destruction album artwork. The multi-ball can be activated when the yellow light is lit on the G ramp, this will open a trap door and send the ball into the snake pit (if the ball is shot up the ramp which is a hard shot), pulling the rose plunger will then activate the multi-ball. An "R" ramp is also featured completing the "GN'R" logo. The gameplay is a mode-based game like that of The Addams Family, Jurassic Park, or Tommy. The machine also uses magnets as ball stoppers, a feature that was used previously on The Addams Family, and a video mode for extra points.

No longer in production, this machine is now a hot item on online auction sites and second hand arcade stores. This is one of the most popular pinball machines from Data East.

Lawsuit
Former Guns N' Roses guitarist Gilby Clarke sued the band over the use of his likeness in the game, as he had been a member of the band when the machine was under production but was out by the time it was released.

References

External links
  (Data East Version)
  (JJP Guns N' Roses Not In This Lifetime (Collector's Edition)
  (JJP Guns N' Roses Not In This Lifetime (Limited Edition)
  (JJP Guns N' Roses Not In This Lifetime (Team Edition) 
Pinpedia entry for Guns N' Roses
The GameRoom Blog: Curtis the Cougar, Axl, Slash and Me -- Insights into the Making of a Classic Rock & Roll Pinball Machine

1994 pinball machines
Data East pinball machines
Guns N' Roses